Camille Catala (born 6 May 1991 in Montpellier) is a French footballer. Catala plays as a striker and has been active with the France women's national football team on the youth circuit. In 2010, she played on the under-19 team that won the 2010 UEFA Women's Under-19 Championship.

Career

Saint-Étienne 

Catala began her career at Saint-Christol-lès-Alès. With the club, she made an appearance in a Challenge de France match before departing for Racing Club de Saint-Étienne, where she was inserted as a starter upon arrival. In her first season with the club, she appeared in 15 matches scoring only one goal, which came on 10 May 2009 in a 2–2 draw with Nord Allier Yzeure. The following season saw RC Saint-Étienne merge with Ligue 1 club AS Saint-Étienne to form the club's women's section. Catala again entered the season as a starter scoring her first goal of the season in her club's 1–4 loss to Nord Allier Yzeure.

Juvisy 

In June 2012, it was announced that Catala would be joining Juvisy.

International 

Catala has been active with the women's section of the national team. She has earned caps with the women's under-17 and under-19 teams. With the under-17 team, she participated in both the 2008 UEFA Women's Under-17 Championship and the inaugural 2008 FIFA U-17 Women's World Cup, where France were eliminated in the group stage. Catala's only goal in the World Cup came in France's 6–2 thrashing of Paraguay. With the under-19s, Catala played in the La Manga Cup international tournament and the 2009 UEFA Women's Under-19 Championship reached the semi-finals before bowing out to Sweden in extra time.  She appeared for France at the 2012 Summer Olympics.

Career statistics

Club 

Statistics accurate as of 1 September 2016

International 

(Correct as of 1 September 2016)

International goals

Honours

SheBelieves Cup: Winner 2017

References

External links 
 
 Player stats at footofeminin.fr 
  
 
 
 
 
 

1991 births
Living people
French women's footballers
Footballers from Montpellier
France women's youth international footballers
France women's international footballers
Footballers at the 2012 Summer Olympics
Olympic footballers of France
AS Saint-Étienne (women) players
Paris FC (women) players
Women's association football forwards
Division 1 Féminine players
UEFA Women's Euro 2017 players